Normand "Norm" Léveillé (born January 10, 1963) is a Canadian former professional hockey left winger. He played one season and one month in the National Hockey League for the Boston Bruins, before his career was cut short at age 19 by a brain aneurysm suffered during a game at the Pacific Coliseum, which left him unable to walk. After he recovered, Léveillé devoted his energies to therapy for others with disabling conditions. He is the founder and president of the Centre Normand-Léveillé at Drummondville in the Centre-du-Québec region of Quebec. His story is told in Un arrêt en plein vol by Thérèse Desjardins (2005.)

Playing career
Léveillé was born in Montreal, Quebec. As a youth, he played in the 1975 and 1976 Quebec International Pee-Wee Hockey Tournaments with a minor ice hockey team from Montreal. He was drafted in the first round, 14th overall in the 1981 NHL Entry Draft by the Boston Bruins. He was a highly touted prospect coming out of the QMJHL after a 101-point season in his last year with the Chicoutimi Saguenéens. In his rookie year with the Bruins, he scored 33 points in 60 games.

On October 23, 1982, after the first period in a game against the Vancouver Canucks in Vancouver, British Columbia during his second season with the Bruins, Léveillé complained of feeling dizzy and having pains in his shoulder. As the trainers began tending to him, he lost consciousness. He was rushed to a local hospital, where doctors diagnosed a brain aneurysm. Léveillé was rushed into emergency surgery in an effort to save his life. After surgery, he was comatose for three weeks and remained hospitalized for an additional three weeks. He eventually recovered enough to walk again, but at the age of 19, his promising career as an NHL player was over. Doctors confirmed that his aneurysm was caused by a congenital condition and was not triggered by an on-ice incident.

In 1995, the Boston Bruins invited Léveillé to the closing ceremonies of the Boston Garden, where he was allowed to skate on the Garden ice one last time. Bruins captain Ray Bourque helped escort Léveillé around the ice surface.

Career statistics

Regular season and playoffs

References

External links

1963 births
Living people
Boston Bruins draft picks
Boston Bruins players
Canadian disability rights activists
Canadian ice hockey left wingers
Chicoutimi Saguenéens (QMJHL) players
French Quebecers
Ice hockey people from Montreal
National Hockey League first-round draft picks